The ice hockey section of Umeå-based Swedish sports club Tegs SK currently plays in Division 1, the third tier of ice hockey in Sweden.  The club had its greatest success in 1967 when it managed promotion to the previous Division 1 which was at the time the top-tier hockey league in Sweden.  Their time in the top flight was short-lived however, as they were relegated again after the 1967–68 season.  More recently, the club played two seasons (2003–2005) in Sweden's second-tier Allsvenskan before being relegated back down to Division 1 in its current format as Sweden's third-tier league.

Tegs SK plays their home matches in T3 Center, a venue they share with HockeyAllsvenskan's IF Björklöven.

External links
 Official website
 Profile on Eliteprospects.com

Ice hockey teams in Sweden
Sport in Umeå
1898 establishments in Sweden
Ice hockey clubs established in 1898
Ice hockey teams in Västerbotten County